Avis de Recherche (AdR) is a Canadian French language Category B specialty channel devoted to crime prevention. Despite AdR's Category B licence, it was formerly a must-carry channel in the province of Quebec on digital basic cable.

Programming and format 
AdR is a specialty service dedicated to help law enforcement authorities; where viewers are invited to communicate any clues, tips and leads which might help police find missing persons or resolve criminal acts.

Programming on AdR comes in the form of capsules or segments that vary from 30–60 seconds in length and feature bulletins from the police regarding various crimes, missing and/or wanted persons. This format repeats over a 24-hour period.

History 
The idea of AdR was formed in 1999, when founder Vincent Géracitano's Montreal office was broken into. The thieves were caught on surveillance video and the tape was taken to the police. However, police did not have any way to broadcast the tape, and the case wasn't sensational enough to be carried in the mainstream news. This incident sparked the idea for Avis de Recherche.

In September 2002, Géracitano was granted approval by the Canadian Radio-television and Telecommunications Commission (CRTC), to operate a category 2 digital cable television channel called Avis de Recherche.

Two years after being granted approval, on October 21, 2004, AdR launched exclusively on Vidéotron in Quebec. Unlike most other specialty channels that collect a subscription fee from cable companies for distribution, AdR was initially paying Vidéotron, its only distributor, $0.02 per subscriber to be distributed on its digital basic system for free. The fee charged by the distributor eventually climbed to $0.05 per subscriber per month by early 2008. With 700,000 subscribers at that time on Videotron's digital cable at 5 cents each, combined with minimal sources of revenue, AdR was facing the inevitable.

In March 2007, AdR and several other current and new television licensees applied to either keep or gain mandatory digital basic cable status on all digital cable providers. In July 2007, AdR was approved as a must-carry service on digital cable in Quebec on the grounds that it is of "exceptional importance", with a subscription fee of $0.06 per subscriber and a mandate to spend 20% of its subscriber revenues on Canadian programming.

Later that year, Quebecor Media, owner of Vidéotron, appealed the decision to the Privy Council mainly on the grounds that the 6 cent increase would make the basic cable package unaffordable, thus violating the Broadcasting Act. This led the CRTC to reconsider its decision. However, in January 2008, the CRTC upheld its original decision with minor adjustments, including an increase from 20% to 43% expenditure of its subscription revenues on Canadian programming. Effective January 24, 2008, the CRTC's decision meant all digital television providers in Quebec must carry AdR as part of their digital basic package, and in response to this decision AdR decided to invest in new broadcast systems from MaestroVision, a Canadian provider of video solutions.

In January 2013, AdR filed a request with the CRTC to renew its mandatory carriage, whilst raising its carriage rate to $0.08 per subscriber. AdR justified its requested increase due mainly to inflation. Its rate of 6 cents was initially approved in 2007. The licence renewal would have fixed the rate until 2020. It also justified the increase due to the CRTC's demand that it closed-caption its entire schedule. At the same time, its owners also proposed mandatory carriage for a national, English-language version of Avis de Recherche known as All Points Bulletin.

References

External links 
  

Digital cable television networks in Canada
Television channels and stations established in 2004
French-language television networks in Canada
Civil crime prevention
Law enforcement in Canada